Crommelin is an ancient lunar impact crater that is located in the vicinity of the south pole of the Moon, on the far side. It lies to the north of the large crater Zeeman, and to the east-northeast of Numerov.

This formation has been almost completely worn away by subsequent impacts, leaving little more than a crater-riddled depression in the surface. There is an equally worn crater lying across the northern rim, and Crommelin X is attached to the outward-bulging northwest perimeter. The largest of the craterlets within the interior form a pair near the southern rim. There is a slight central peak, consisting of little more than a low rise in the surface.

Satellite craters 

By convention these features are identified on Lunar maps by placing the letter on the side of the crater midpoint that is closest to Crommelin.

References 

 
 
 
 
 
 
 
 
 
 
 
 

Impact craters on the Moon